The Taliban has ruled Afghanistan as the Islamic Emirate of Afghanistan since taking control by force in 2021, overthrowing the internationally recognized Islamic Republic of Afghanistan. The takeover was widely criticized by the international community, and no countries have extended diplomatic recognition to the new regime, despite nominally maintaining relations with Afghanistan. The Taliban has aggressively campaigned for international recognition since the takeover. Several countries have vowed never to recognize the Islamic Emirate, and others have said they will do so only if human rights in the country are respected. Some countries have accredited Taliban diplomats at the chargé d'affaires level despite not recognizing the Islamic Emirate.

The Taliban previously ruled Afghanistan from 1996 to 2001 and received limited diplomatic recognition, with the United Nations and most countries continuing to recognize the Islamic State of Afghanistan, which the Taliban had reduced to a rump state.

Ousted president Ashraf Ghani has largely remained silent since the takeover, and has not formed a government in exile. Ghani's vice president Amrullah Saleh declared himself caretaker president and relocated to Panjshir Province after the Taliban takeover with the support of the National Resistance Front. However, he fled Afghanistan after the Taliban quickly captured the province. Although the NRF continues to wage a guerrilla insurgency, it has failed to take any territory and neither Saleh nor the NRF have received any international support, leaving the Taliban as the only viable claimant to Afghanistan's government.

Several countries, including Canada, Tajikistan and Kazakhstan, designate the Taliban as a terrorist organization.

1996–2001 
Between 1996 and 2001, only three UN member states – Pakistan, Saudi Arabia, and the United Arab Emirates (UAE) – recognized the Islamic Emirate as the rightful government of Afghanistan. The Islamic Emirate received recognition from the partially recognized Chechen Republic of Ichkeria; though Chechen president Aslan Maskhadov would later describe the Islamic Emirate as an "illegitimate" government. The Taliban government additionally received support from Turkmenistan, though the country did not provide the Emirate with formal recognition.

The Taliban government was not recognized by the United Nations, which instead continued to recognize the Islamic State of Afghanistan as the legitimate government of Afghanistan.

2021–present 

Despite no countries recognizing the Islamic Emirate as the legitimate successor of the Islamic Republic of Afghanistan, there have been official diplomatic talks between the Taliban and other countries since September 2021.

National governments 
  According to the Australian Minister for Foreign Affairs, Marise Payne, "We make no premature commitments to engage with an Afghan administration that is Taliban led." Australia will support international efforts to maintain pressure on the Taliban and any future Afghan administration to meet its responsibilities to its people, its region and the wider world.
  According to the Foreign Minister of Bangladesh, AK Abdul Momen, "If a Taliban government is formed, which has been done, our door will be open to them if it is a government of the people" and "No matter which new government is formed, we will accept if it is of the people". Both Bangladesh and Afghanistan have good diplomatic relations, with the minister considering Bangladesh as a "potential development partner and a friend of Afghanistan".
  Prime Minister Justin Trudeau has stated that Canada will not recognize the Islamic Emirate as the legitimate government of Afghanistan and that the Taliban would remain a banned organization in Canada.
  A spokesperson for the foreign ministry of the People's Republic of China stated that China "respects the wishes and choices of the Afghan people" and hopes for "friendship and cooperation" with the new authorities. China also hopes to seek assurances from the Taliban that they will not support the UN-proscribed Turkistan Islamic Party or allow them to operate from Afghan territory. In March 2022, Wang Yi, foreign minister of China, visited Kabul and met with the acting foreign minister of Afghanistan, Amir Khan Muttaqi.

  Czech Foreign Minister Jakub Kulhánek stated that the Czech Republic will "by no means recognize the Taliban under any circumstances" but did not rule out dialogue with the group.
  French Foreign Minister Jean-Yves Le Drian stated that France "refuses to recognize or have any type of relationship with this government".
  The Indian Government does not recognize the country, but has said that they will help Afghanistan whenever required.
 , In aftermath of Fall of Kabul, former vice president Jusuf Kalla believed that Indonesia would not sever the diplomatic connection between Indonesia and Afghanistan. Indonesian constitutional experts have urged the Indonesian government to not hastily recognize Afghanistan under the Taliban government as they deemed the transfer of power to have taken place without constitutional means. These concerns were voiced on 17 August 2021 and were formalized with a statement by the Commission of Constitutional Studies of People's Consultative Assembly three days later. On 26 August 2021, Minister of Foreign Affairs Retno Marsudi met Taliban officials and representatives in Qatar. In the meeting, she urged to her Taliban counterpart to (1) ensure stability and prosperity of Afghanistan, (2) formation of inclusive government, (3) maintaining respect, dignities, and basic rights to Afghanistan women.
  Iranian President Ebrahim Raisi has said the US "military failure" in Afghanistan offers an opportunity to establish lasting peace in the country. Iranian state TV quoted him as saying that "America's military defeat and its withdrawal must become an opportunity to restore life, security and durable peace in Afghanistan". Iran accredited the Taliban's nominee for Chargé d'Affairs, Mohammad Afzal Haqqani, on February 26, 2023, and handed over the embassy in Tehran.
  Foreign Minister Saifuddin Abdullah has stated that Malaysia is undecided on whether to recognize the Taliban and will take a very cautious approach.
  Pakistani Prime Minister Imran Khan stated that Afghans have "broken the shackles of slavery". Foreign Minister Shah Mahmood Qureshi stated that Pakistan would not recognize a Taliban-led government without consultations with regional and international partners, adding that he was pleased that the transfer of power took place without bloodshed. The Pakistani Representative to the United Nations referred to the government led by Ashraf Ghani as "a now defunct regime" and criticized both the participation of the Afghan representative appointed by Ghani as well as being blocked from addressing the India-presided UN Security Council at a meeting of the security council. The Pakistani government claimed that Mir Rahman Rahmani, the Speaker of the Wolesi Jirga, met Foreign Minister Shah Mahmood Qureshi and agreed to engage with the Taliban to form an inclusive government. Pakistani National Security Advisor, Moeed Yusuf, has warned that the West risks a second 9/11 situation if it doesn’t “immediately recognise” the Taliban.
  Qatar has served as the main diplomatic hub of the Taliban since 2012, when the Taliban's Political Office opened there, with the assistance of the Qatari government. The office hosted senior Taliban diplomats; the head of the Political Office is a member of the Taliban's governing Leadership Council. From 2019 until the recapture of the country, Third Deputy Leader Abdul Ghani Baradar, a co-founder of the Taliban, was stationed in Qatar as the head of the Political Office. He negotiated and signed the US–Taliban deal in Qatar, and arranged for the handover of Kabul with U.S. military leaders. Baradar returned to Afghanistan on 17 August 2021, and Suhail Shaheen took over the Political Office, which continues to serve as a diplomatic hub for the Taliban. The Taliban has since also been allowed to take over the Embassy of Afghanistan in Qatar. Acting Foreign Minister Amir Khan Muttaqi has made numerous visits to Qatar to meet with both Qatari and other world leaders, and has visited Qatar more than any other country.
  Russia has not recognized the Islamic Emirate as the lawful authority of Afghanistan. Moscow has said it hopes to develop ties with the Taliban, although it also says it is in no rush to recognize them as the country's rulers. On 16 August 2021, Dmitry Zhirnov, the Russian Ambassador to Afghanistan, praised the group and stated that "the situation is peaceful and good and everything has calmed down in the city. The situation in Kabul now under the Taliban is better than it was under Ashraf Ghani." Zhirnov met a Taliban representative on September 15 to discuss security for the embassy in Kabul, which remained open. On October 21, a day after hosting the Taliban for talks in Moscow, Vladimir Putin announced that Russia would “move in the direction” of delisting the Taliban as a terrorist group, although the president stressed that the UN Security Council should be the first to change the Taliban’s designation. Soon after, the Russian state news agency Rossiya Segodnya forbade its reporters from referring to the Taliban in published content as a terrorist organization that is banned in Russia. This has happened before: In November 2018, management at RIA Novosti ordered staff not to mention in reporting about the Taliban that it is a banned terrorist organization in Russia. However, the Taliban are still on Russia’s federal list of banned terrorist organizations. On 31 March 2022, the Russian Federation became one of the first countries to accept the diplomatic credentials of a Taliban-appointed envoy, although this is not equivalent to official recognition.
  In August 2021, Saudi Arabia evacuated all of its diplomats from its embassy in Kabul during the Taliban offensive. Although Saudi Arabia does not recognize the re-established Islamic Emirate of Afghanistan, the Saudi embassy re-opened on 30 November 2021 to provide consular services to Afghan citizens.
  In August 2021, Spanish Minister of Foreign Affairs José Manuel Albares announced that the country would not recognize the Taliban government "imposed by force", although they did not rule out the possibility of keeping "operational contact" with the Taliban government to continue with the evacuation procedure.
  In September 2021, Foreign Minister Mevlüt Çavuşoğlu said Turkey was in no rush to recognize the Taliban government. In March 2022, however, Çavuşoğlu has expressed the intention to internationally recognize the Islamic Emirate.
  In March 2022, Turkmenistan accepted the credentials of the Taliban's appointee for chargé d'affaires to the Afghan Embassy in Ashgabat, Fazal Muhammad Sabir, without formally recognizing the Islamic Emirate. A ceremony held at the embassy was attended by Deputy Foreign Minister of Turkmenistan Wafa Khadzhiev.
  Former British Prime Minister Boris Johnson has urged other countries not to recognize the Islamic Emirate as the legitimate government of Afghanistan. Deputy Prime Minister Dominic Raab has stated that the UK "will not recognize the Taliban as the new government in Kabul" but will be willing to engage in direct communications with the group.
  Secretary of State Antony Blinken said in an interview that the United States will not recognize any government that harbors terrorist groups or does not uphold basic human rights. The US State Department later declined to say if the United States still recognized Ashraf Ghani as the President of Afghanistan.
  The UAE's embassy opened on 30th November 2021. In December 2022, Second Deputy Leader of Afghanistan and Acting Defense Minister Mullah Yaqoob met with UAE President Mohammad bin Zayed Al Nahyan in Abu Dhabi. They discussed strengthening of relations.

International organizations 
  The United Nations has called for "the establishment, through inclusive negotiations, of a government that is united, inclusive and representative with the full, equal and meaningful participation of women". Ghulam M. Isaczai, the Afghan representative to the United Nations, who was appointed by the Islamic Republic of Afghanistan, continued to represent the country at a meeting of the Security Council held on 16 August 2021. The second Taliban government is not recognized by the United Nations, which instead continues to recognize the Islamic Republic as the country's legitimate government. On 1 December 2021, the nine-nation Credentials Committee of the General Assembly voted to defer a decision to allow the Taliban to represent Afghanistan at the UN. On 22 December 2021, the UN adopted a resolution aimed at facilitating aid to Afghanistan. On 15 February 2022, the UN released an updated list of member state officials with the names of Ghani administration officials removed.
  The European Union's HR/VP Josep Borrell stated that the EU "will have to get in touch with the authorities in Kabul, whatever they are. The Taliban have won the war, so we will have to talk with them" but that the EU had no plans to recognize the Islamic Emirate of Afghanistan. On 23 January 2022, the EU's embassy officially opened following the meeting between Taliban officials and other European officials in Oslo.

See also 
 Foreign relations of Afghanistan
 List of international trips made by Amir Khan Muttaqi as Acting Foreign Minister of Afghanistan

References 

Foreign relations of Afghanistan
Diplomatic recognition